Justin Gimelstob and Graydon Oliver were the defending champions, but Oliver did not participate this year.  Gimelstob partnered Nathan Healey and successfully defended his title.

Gimelstob and Healey won the title, defeating Dmitry Tursunov and Mikhail Youzhny 4–6, 6–3, 6–2 in the final.

Seeds

Draw

Draw

External links
Draw

2005 ATP Tour
2005 China Open (tennis)